Maloye Marinkino is a rural locality (a village) in Andreyevskoye Rural Settlement, Alexandrovsky District, Vladimir Oblast, Russia. The population was 9 as of 2010.

Geography 
Maloye Marinkino is located 14 km southeast of Alexandrov (the district's administrative centre) by road. Bolshoye Marinkino is the nearest rural locality.

References 

Rural localities in Alexandrovsky District, Vladimir Oblast